The 2019 South Carolina Gamecocks football team (variously South Carolina, USC, SC, or The Gamecocks) represented the University of South Carolina in the 2019 NCAA Division I FBS football season. This season marked the Gamecocks 126th overall season, 28th as a member of the SEC East Division. The Gamecocks played their home games at Williams–Brice Stadium in Columbia, South Carolina, and were led by fourth-year head coach Will Muschamp.

Preseason

2019 recruiting class
South Carolina jumped out to a fast start for recruiting the 2019 class with early commitments from 4 star Defensive Lineman Rodricus Fitten, and 3 star Offensive tackle Jaylen Nichols. In January 2018 the Gamecocks received commitments from 4 star OT Mark Fox out of Miami, and 3 star JUCO DE Devontae Davis from Georgia Military College. USC also picked up 3 star center, Vincent Murphy from St. Thomas Aquinas High School in Florida.

On April 4, 2018, 4 star QB Ryan Hilinski out of Orange Lutheran High School in Orange, California committed to South Carolina. Ryan is the brother of the former Washington State QB Tyler Hilinski. Also in April, 4 star TE Traevon Kenion committed to the Gamecocks.

On May 25, 5 star defensive end Zacch Pickens committed to South Carolina.

SEC media poll
The 2019 SEC Media Days were held July 15–18 in Birmingham, Alabama. In the preseason media poll, South Carolina was projected to finish in fourth in the East Division.

Preseason All-SEC teams
The Gamecocks had two players selected to the preseason all-SEC teams.

Offense

3rd team

Bryan Edwards – WR

Defense

2nd team

Javon Kinlaw – DL

Schedule
South Carolina announced its 2019 football schedule on September 18, 2018. The 2019 schedule consists of 7 home and 4 away games along with one neutral site game in the regular season. The Gamecocks hosted SEC foes; Alabama, Kentucky, Florida, and Vanderbilt. They traveled to face; Missouri, Georgia, Tennessee, and Texas A&M. South Carolina's nonconference schedule features teams from the ACC, Big South, and Sun Belt. They faced North Carolina in neutral site game in Charlotte, NC, and hosted Charleston Southern (Big South), Appalachian State (Sun Belt), and Clemson (ACC).

According to ESPN and other outlets, South Carolina had the toughest schedule in the country.

ESPN analyst Paul Finebaum described the toughness of the Gamecocks schedule. “I don’t think anyone could argue against the following statement that South Carolina has the hardest schedule in the country, it is absolutely brutal. There is just no getting around it. So knowing that you have Alabama, knowing that you have Georgia and Clemson. By almost everyone’s projections, those are the No. 1, 2 and 3 schools in the country.

Personnel

Coaching staff

Roster

Depth chart

Game summaries

vs. North Carolina

Charleston Southern

Alabama

at Missouri

Kentucky

at Georgia

Florida

at Tennessee

Vanderbilt

Appalachian State

at Texas A&M

Clemson

Schedule Source:

Rankings

Players drafted into the NFL

References

South Carolina
South Carolina Gamecocks football seasons
South Carolina Gamecocks football